The 1978 Nevada Wolf Pack football team represented the University of Nevada, Reno during the 1978 NCAA Division I-AA football season. Nevada competed as an independent. The Wolf Pack were led by third-year head coach Chris Ault and played their home games at Mackay Stadium.

Schedule

References

Nevada
Nevada Wolf Pack football seasons
Nevada Wolf Pack football